The 1926 Tour of the Basque Country was the third edition of the Tour of the Basque Country cycle race and was held from 4 August to 8 August 1926. The race started in Bilbao and finished in Las Arenas. The race was won by Nicolas Frantz.

General classification

References

1926
Bas